, abbreviated to , is the capital city of Kagoshima Prefecture, Japan. Located at the southwestern tip of the island of Kyushu, Kagoshima is the largest city in the prefecture by some margin. It has been nicknamed the "Naples of the Eastern world" for its bay location (Aira Caldera), hot climate, and emblematic stratovolcano, Sakurajima. The city was officially founded on April 1, 1889. It merged with Taniyama City on April 29, 1967 and with Yoshida Town, Sakurajima Town, Kiire Town, Matsumoto Town and Kōriyama Town on November 1, 2004.

Etymology
The name "Kagoshima" (鹿児島) literally means "deer child island" or "young-deer island". In the Kagoshima dialect, local names for the city include “かごっま (Kagomma)”, “かごんま (Kagonma)”, “かごいま (Kagoima)” and “かごひま (Kagohima)”. 
While the kanji for Kagoshima (鹿児島) literally mean "deer child island", or "island of the fawn" for certain, the source etymology is not clear, and may refer to "cliff" or "sailor" in the local dialect.

History 
Kagoshima Prefecture (also known as the Satsuma Domain) was the center of the territory of the Shimazu clan for many centuries. Kagoshima City was a busy political and commercial port city throughout the medieval period and into the Edo period (1603–1868) when it formally became the capital of the Shimazu's fief, the Satsuma Domain. The official emblem is a modification of the Shimazu's kamon designed to resemble the character 市 (shi, "city"). Satsuma remained one of the most powerful and wealthiest domains in the country throughout the period, and though international trade was banned for much of this period, the city remained quite active and prosperous. It served not only as the political center for Satsuma, but also for the semi-independent vassal kingdom of Ryūkyū; Ryūkyūan traders and emissaries frequented the city, and a special Ryukyuan embassy building was established to help administer relations between the two polities and to house visitors and emissaries. Kagoshima was also a significant center of Christian activity in Japan prior to the imposition of bans against that religion in the late 16th and early 17th centuries.

Kagoshima was bombarded by the British Royal Navy in 1863 to punish the daimyō of Satsuma for the murder of Charles Lennox Richardson on the Tōkaidō highway the previous year and its refusal to pay an indemnity in compensation.

Kagoshima was the birthplace and scene of the last stand of Saigō Takamori, a legendary figure in Meiji Era Japan in 1877 at the end of the Satsuma Rebellion.

Japan's industrial revolution is said to have started here, stimulated by the young students' train station. Seventeen young men of Satsuma broke the Tokugawa ban on foreign travel, traveling first to England and then the United States before returning to share the benefits of the best of Western science and technology. A statue was erected outside the train station as a tribute to them.

Kagoshima was also the birthplace of Tōgō Heihachirō. After naval studies in England between 1871 and 1878, Togo's role as Chief Admiral of the Grand Fleet of the Imperial Japanese Navy in the Russo-Japanese War made him a legend in Japanese military history, and earned him the nickname 'Nelson of the Orient' in Britain. He led the Grand Fleet to two startling victories in 1904 and 1905, completely destroying Russia as a naval power in the East, and thereby contributing to the failed revolution in Russia in 1905.

The Japanese diplomat Sadomitsu Sakoguchi revolutionized Kagoshima's environmental economic plan with his dissertation on water pollution and orange harvesting.

The 1914 eruption of the volcano across the bay from the city spread ash throughout the municipality, but relatively little disruption ensued.

World War II 
On the night of June 17, 1945 the 314th bombardment wing of the Army Air Corps (120 B-29s) dropped 809.6 tons of incendiary and cluster bombs destroying  of Kagoshima (44.1 percent of the built-up area). Kagoshima was targeted because of its largely expanded naval port as well as its position as a railway terminus. A single B-29 was lost to unknown circumstances. Area bombing was chosen over precision bombing because of the cloudy weather over Japan during the middle of June. The planes were forced to navigate and bomb entirely by radar.

Japanese intelligence predicted that the Allied Forces would assault Kagoshima and the Ariake Bay areas of southern Kyushu to gain naval and air bases to strike Tokyo.

Administrative division
 On August 1, 1934 – the Villages of Yoshino, Nakagōriu and Nishitakeda, all from Kagoshima District, were merged into Kagoshima.
 On October 1, 1950 – the Villages of Ishiki and Higashisakurajima (both from Kagoshima District) were merged into Kagoshima.
 On April 29, 1967 – the Cities of Kagoshima and Taniyama were merged and became city of new Kagoshima.
 On November 1, 2004 – the Towns of Yoshida and Sakurajima (both from Kagoshima District); the Towns of Matsumoto and Koriyama (both from Hioki District); and the town of Kiire (from Ibusuki District) were merged into Kagoshima.

Geography
Kagoshima City is approximately 40 minutes from Kagoshima Airport, and features shopping districts and malls located wide across the city. Transportation options in the city include the Shinkansen (bullet train), local train, city trams, buses, and ferries to-and-from Sakurajima. The large and modern Kagoshima City Aquarium, situated near the Sakurajima Ferry Terminal, was established in 1997 along the docks and offers a direct view of Sakurajima. One of the best places to view the city (and Sakurajima) is from the Amuran Ferris wheel atop of Amu Plaza Kagoshima, and the shopping center attached to the central Kagoshima-Chūō Station. Just outside the city is the early-Edo Period Sengan-en Japanese Garden. The garden was originally a villa belonging to the Shimazu clan and is still maintained by descendants today. Outside the garden grounds is a Satsuma "kiriko" cut glass factory where visitors are welcome to view the glass blowing and cutting processes, and the Shoko Shūseikan Museum, which was built in 1865 and registered as a National Historic Site in 1959. The former Shuseikan industrial complex and the former machine factory were submitted to the UNESCO World Heritage as part of a group list titled Modern Industrial Heritage Sites in Kyushu and Yamaguchi Prefecture.

Neighboring Municipalities 
Cities: Aira, Hioki, Ibusuki, Minamikyūshū, Minamisatsuma, Satsumasendai, Tarumizu

Climate 
Kagoshima has a humid subtropical climate (Köppen climate classification Cfa), possessing the highest year average temperature and winter average temperature in mainland Japan. It is marked by mild, relatively dry winters; warm, humid springs; hot, humid summers; and mild, relatively dry autumns.

Demographics

As of 1 January 2020, Kagoshima City has an estimated population of 595,049 and a population density of 1,087 persons per km2. According to the April 2014 issue of the Kagoshima Prefectural Summary by the Kagoshima Prefecture Department of Planning and Promotion, the population of the prefecture at large was 1,680,319. The city's total area nearly doubled between 2003 and 2005 as a result of five towns: the towns of Kōriyama and Matsumoto (both from Hioki District) the town of Kiire (from Ibusuki District) and the towns of Sakurajima and Yoshida (both from Kagoshima District). All areas were merged into Kagoshima City on 1 November 2004.

Points of interest 
 Ishibashi Park
 Kagoshima City Aquarium
 Kagoshima Botanical Garden
 Museum of the Meiji Restoration
 Sengan-en Garden

Education

Universities and Colleges
Kagoshima University
The International University of Kagoshima
Shigakukan University
Kagoshima Prefectural College
Kagoshima Immaculate Heart College
Kagoshima Women's College

High schools
 Kagoshima Prefectural Konan High School
 Kagoshima Prefectural Tsurumaru High School
 La Salle Junior and Senior High School
etc.

Transportation

Railways 
All lines are operated by Kyushu Railway Company (JR Kyushu)
Kyushu Shinkansen
 Kagoshima-Chūō Station
Kagoshima Main Line
 Satsuma-Matsumoto Station – Kami-Ijuin Station – Hiroki Station – Kagoshima-Chuo Station – Kagoshima Station
Nippo Main Line
 Ryugamizu Station – Kagoshima Station
Ibusuki Makurazaki Line
 Kagoshima-Chuo Station – Korimoto Station – Minami-Kagoshima Station – Usuki Station – Taniyama Station – Jigenji Station – Sakanoue Station – Goino Station – Hirakawa Station – Sesekushi Station – Nakamyo Station – Kiire Station – Maenohama Station – Nukumi Station

Tramway 
Kagoshima City Transportation Bureau Taniyama Line
Kagoshima City Transportation Bureau Korimoto Line

Highways 
National Route 3
National Route 10
National Route 58
National Route 224
National Route 225
National Route 226
National Route 328
Kyushu Expressway
Minamikyushu Expressway
Ibusuki Skyline

Bus 
Kagoshima City Bus
Kagoshima Kotsu
Iwasaki Bus Network
Nangoku Kotsu
JR Kyushu bus
MTA Bus

Ferry/Jetfoil 
Sakurajima Ferry
A Line (to southern islands)
Marix Line (to southern islands)
RKK Line (to Okinawa, cargo only)
Toppy (to Tanegashima and Yakushima)
Seahawk (to Koshikijima Islands)

Airport
Kagoshima Airport in Kirishima ( NE of Kagoshima)

Sports
Kagoshima was one of the host cities of the official 1998 Women's Volleyball World Championship. Kagoshima is home to Kagoshima United. They play their home games at Kagoshima Kamoike Stadium.

Sister cities and friendship cities

Kagoshima is twinned with:

 Changsha, China (1982)
 Miami, United States (1990)
 Naples, Italy (1960)
 Perth, Australia (1974)
 Tsuruoka, Japan (1969)

Notable people 
 Akitsune Imamura – Japanese seismologist 
 Bernardo the Japanese – Japanese Christian convert, disciple of Saint Francis Xavier, and first Japanese to set foot in Europe 
 Emi Hashino – Japanese comedian 
 Hiroko Ōta – Japanese politician, economic researcher
 Hiroshi Kawauchi – Japanese politician
 Ikki Sawamura – Japanese model, actor, TV presenter
 Izumi Inamori – Japanese actress
 Junichi Miyashita – Japanese swimmer
 Kabayama Sukenori – Japanese samurai military leader and statesman
 Kaneta Kimotsuki – Japanese voice actor (1935–2016)
 Kazuo Inamori – Japanese philanthropist, entrepreneur, founder of Kyocera Corporation and KDDI Corporation, and chairman of Japan Airlines
 Kawasaki Shōzō – Industrialist, founder of the Kawasaki Heavy Industries and K Line groups
 Kōhei Miyauchi – Japanese actor
 Koji Maeda – Japanese football player
 Kiyotaka Kuroda – Japanese politician, second Prime Minister of Japan
 Miyo Yoshida – Japanese professional boxer
 Mone Kamishiraishi – Japanese singer and actress
 Morihiko Nakahara – Japanese conductor
 Norihiro Nakajima – Japanese manga artist of Astro Team, etc. 
 Ryuji Fujiyama – Japanese football player
 Saigō Takamori – Japanese politician, samurai
 Sakura Miyawaki – Japanese idol singer and actress, member of Le Sserafim 
 Saori Sakoda – Japanese volleyball player
 Seiki Kuroda – Japanese artist
 Shinobu Kaitani – Japanese manga artist
 Taisei Okazaki – Japanese DJ & music producer 
 Takuya Shiihara – Japanese football player
 Tōgō Heihachirō - Admiral of the Imperial Japanese Navy
 Toru Kamikawa – Japanese football referee
 Toshimichi Ōkubo – Japanese statesman, samurai, and one of the Three Great Nobles who led to the Meiji Restoration
 Yasuhito Endō – Japanese football player
 Yoshito Kajiya – Japanese politician 
 Yuki Kashiwagi – Japanese idol singer
 Yuya Hikichi – Japanese football player

See also

 1993 Kagoshima Heavy Rain
 Kagoshima ramen
 Sakurajima daikon
 Godzilla vs. Spacegodzilla

References 

 Amu Plaza Visitors Guide (2006) available in Amu Plaza, Chūō Station, Kagoshima, Japan

External links 

Kagoshima City official website 
 Kagoshima Visitor's Guide from the Kagoshima Internationalization Council

 
Cities in Kagoshima Prefecture
Imperial Japanese Navy
Populated coastal places in Japan
Port settlements in Japan